HGTV (an initialism for Home & Garden Television) is an American pay television channel owned by Warner Bros. Discovery. The network primarily broadcasts reality programming related to home improvement and real estate. As of February 2015, approximately 95,628,000 American households (82.2% of households with television) receive HGTV. The network was bought by Warner Bros. Discovery, then known as Discovery, Inc., in 2018, since which it has been ranked as No. 4 in audience size among cable networks.

History
Kenneth W. Lowe (then a radio executive with The E. W. Scripps Company and, subsequently, the chief executive officer of Scripps Networks Interactive) envisioned the concept of HGTV in 1992. With modest financial support from the E.W. Scripps corporate board, he purchased Cinetel, a small video production company in Knoxville, as the base and production hub of the new network. Lowe cofounded the channel with Susan Packard.

Cinetel became Scripps Productions, but it found producing more than thirty programs simultaneously daunting. The organization brought in former CBS television executive Ed Spray, who implemented a system of producing (nearly all) programming through independent production houses around the United States. Burton Jablin, as Vice President of Programming, set the tone and oversaw the production of the early series. About 90 percent of the channel's programming consisted of original productions at launch, with ten percent licensed and rerun from Canadian channels, PBS, and other sources.

Using local Scripps cable franchises (since divested), the Federal Communications Commission "must carry" provisions of Scripps medium-market television stations, and other small television operators to gain cable carriage, the channel launched on December 30, 1994. The major programming themes, unchanged since the beginning, were home building and remodeling, landscaping and gardening, decorating and design, and crafts and hobbies.

During its development, the channel was originally named the Home, Lawn, and Garden Channel. The name was later shortened and a logo was developed. The logo was amended in 2010, with this version debuting on March 1 of that year. The square with the "G" in it was removed, the roof was increased in size and the "HGTV" letters are now set in Gotham Black (from the original mixture of Futura and Times New Roman), with the other Gotham fonts being used around the network. The network debuted with a skeletal staff, but with gradual acceptance by other cable operators, it now reaches 94 million households in the United States and has either partner networks, or network interests, internationally elsewhere. It is now referred to simply as "HGTV"; the full name of the channel is de-emphasized.

In July 2008, the E.W. Scripps Company spun off the channel and the other Scripps cable channels and web-based properties into a separate company, Scripps Networks Interactive; E.W. Scripps broadcast television and newspaper properties remain as part of the original company.

In December 2011, the channel began broadcasting all of its programming in 16:9 aspect ratio format on its primary standard definition channel. This results in the appearance of black bars on the top and bottom of the screen on 4:3 aspect ratio televisions; its high-definition channel displays the channel's programming in its native aspect ratio.

On March 6, 2018, Discovery Communications completed its merger with Scripps Networks Interactive and assumed control of HGTV, Food Network and Travel Channel.

Programming

HGTV's programming focuses primarily on reality shows on home-buying, renovation and flipping. SNI CEO Ken Lowe stated of the programming strategy that "We're not going to surprise you. We're not going to throw you a curve ball. It's not easy to create content that people are passionate about and somewhat addicted to that is somewhat repetitive." As of 2016, HGTV has invested at least $400 million annually on original programming.

In 2021, a New Yorker feature said that HGTV's programming "for twenty-six years has offered content that is cheering and conflict-free", describing it as "low-budget and unassuming", "of recuperation, or respite", and "apparently at ease with the idea of tranquilizing America." An HGTV executive described how the network tells stories about people having an actual milestone—"celebrating one of the best days of their life."

An annual promotion held by the network is the HGTV Dream Home, a sweepstakes which awards a custom-built house as its grand prize.

High definition
The 1080i high definition simulcast feed of HGTV launched on March 31, 2008. Originally, the HD channel did not simulcast the standard definition feed of HGTV. Instead, the HD channel featured programming separate from the standard channel. The standard definition feed of the channel began to carry the full 16:9 aspect ratio downgraded from the HD feed in a letterboxed format in early 2013.

Carrier disputes

Cablevision
On December 31, 2009, Scripps Networks Interactive removed the Food Network and HGTV from New York City-area cable provider Cablevision, on the day that its carriage contract was set to expire. After months of negotiations, an agreement between Scripps and Cablevision was not reached, prompting the removal of the two channels. On January 21, 2010, Cablevision and Scripps reached a deal and the channels were restored to Cablevision's systems in the New York City area on the same day and by the next day in other areas.

AT&T U-verse
On November 5, 2010, AT&T U-verse dropped the DIY Network, Cooking Channel, Food Network, Great American Country and HGTV, due to a carriage dispute with Scripps Networks. The carriage dispute was resolved two days later, on November 7, 2010, through a new carriage agreement.

Controversies
On June 13, 2012, representatives for HGTV admitted that scenes featured in the original series House Hunters are mostly re-creations of prior events. In many cases, the final decision and purchase were made prior to filming. In some cases, homes visited were not even on the market.

In May 2014, HGTV decided not to premiere the Benham Brothers' series Flip It Forward (which was created for the channel), due to a controversy regarding the Brothers' beliefs concerning homosexuality and anti-abortion.

International

Canada

In 1997, Atlantis Communications and Scripps Networks launched a Canadian version of HGTV as a Category B specialty channel. Through a series of acquisitions over the years, Corus Entertainment became Scripps Networks' partner in the network.

The Canadian version features much of the same programming as the U.S. channel, as well as domestically-produced programs, and some similar programming acquired from other broadcasters. Some of HGTV Canada's programs have, in turn, been picked up by the U.S. channel; Love It or List It and Property Brothers have been among HGTV's most popular programs in the United States. The two programs were originally produced for a local sister channel, W Network, but were later moved to HGTV Canada and other sister channels after W Network was retooled as a general entertainment channel.

Singapore
On March 6, 2014, HGTV Asia was first launched in Singapore via Starhub TV, but on August 31, 2018, it (and other Discovery Network channels) ceased transmission. It was launched on Singtel TV on September 28, 2018 on Channel 250.

Australia
On February 1, 2015, HGTV launched in Australia on Australian IPTV service Fetch TV. Programming from the network also airs free-to-air on Nine Network's digital multichannel 9Life.

Malaysia
On August 31, 2015, HGTV launched in Malaysia on Astro.

Netherlands
On January 21, 2021, it was announced that HGTV will launch through Ziggo in the course of 2021.

New Zealand

On June 27, 2016, HGTV launched in New Zealand as a free-to-air channel on the Freeview terrestrial platform. The channel was started as a joint venture with the Canadian broadcaster Blue Ant Media., but in late 2019 Discovery, Inc. took over the channel. On August 24, 2016, HGTV launched on the Freeview satellite platform and on Sky. HGTV programming is available on-demand via ThreeNow.

Indonesia
On July 1, 2016, HGTV launched in Indonesia on MNC Vision. HGTV also launched on First Media, Indihome UseeTV, MyRepublic and Matrix Gaurda (same with Nex Parabola).

Italy
As of February 2, 2020, HGTV Italia is available through DTTV (free to air terrestrial digital television) on channel 56 and on satellite (Sky and Tivùsat). Most of the schedule is filled with U.S. TV shows, with Italian voice over.

Poland
Scripps Network Interactive purchased a majority stake in TVN from Grupa ITI, taking control of company's channels. On January 7, 2017, HGTV replaced fitness and weather channel TVN Meteo Active. HGTV is referred to in Poland as HGTV Home&Garden. This was the first market in Europe the channel has expanded to.

Philippines
On March 1, 2015, HGTV launched in the Philippines on Skycable, Destiny Cable, and Cignal.

Romania
On December 30, 2019, HGTV launched in Romania on RCS & RDS.

Taiwan
On May 29, 2016, HGTV launched in Taiwan Via Kbro, Taipei Cable, TWT Cable, and New Taipei City Cable. From January 1, 2020, HGTV launched in CHT MOD.

Hong Kong
HGTV was launched on Hong Kong's Now TV and Now Player on September 1, 2021 on channel 529 to replace FOX Networks Group Asia Pacific's channels, planning to launch in myTV Super Channel 611 & i-Cable TV Channel 707, simulcast in SD and HD.

Myanmar
HGTV had its Launch in Sky Net Channel 67 on October 19, 2018, and also plans to launch in Myanmar on CANAL+ Channel 119.

Vietnam
HGTV was launched in Vietnam on November 20, 2018, available on VTVCab and Viettel TV.

Latin America
HGTV was launched in Latin America in partnership with Discovery Inc. in March 2019.

United Kingdom and Ireland

In June 2019, it was announced that former UKTV channel Home, which Discovery had acquired full control of earlier in the year, would be replaced as a UK version of HGTV on January 21, 2020.

Germany
On June 6, 2019, HGTV launched in Germany on Astra 19.2°E and Cable TV free to air.

Middle East and North Africa
In Middle East & North Africa region, HGTV is available on beIN Media channel 260 and is one of their leading lifestyle channels.

South Africa
On July 15, 2019, Discovery launched the re-imagined South African version of HGTV on the DStv satellite platform on Channel 177, as well as on the DStv Now streaming platform. An African version of HGTV launched on Zuku TV on Channel 728.

Bulgaria 
After the closing of Fine Living for Bulgaria (January 2020) starts HGTV.

Hogar de HGTV

Hogar de HGTV is a spin-off American Spanish-language network of HGTV, featuring content from HGTV, Discovery, and Food Network dubbed into Spanish, along with some original content delivered natively in Spanish. The network was launched on June 30, 2020, and has limited carriage through the Spanish/Latino tiers of national cable providers, including Cox and Spectrum at launch. It is distributed exclusively in high-definition.

Awards
HGTV was honored with the Academy of Achievement Award for their significant impact on the home and garden décor industry at the 22nd Annual Accessories Resource Team (ARTS) gala event on January 2, 2011. In 2012, HGTV won the Dixon Award for Best TV Channel.

See also
 List of United States cable and satellite television networks
 Orphan initialism

References

Further reading

External links
 
 HGTV Magazine

 
1994 establishments in Tennessee
Cable television in the United States
Warner Bros. Discovery networks
English-language television stations in the United States
Former E. W. Scripps Company subsidiaries
Home improvement
Gardening television
Organizations based in Knoxville, Tennessee
Television channels and stations established in 1994
Television networks in the United States